Petersen Arboretum is an arboretum located in Petersen Park, Alpine, Utah, United States. It was established prior to 2003, when 150 additional trees were planted. Its collection has about 50 types of trees, including Big Tooth and Amur Maples, Tri-colored Oaks, and the Dawn Redwoods.  The arboretum is located at Ridge Drive and 100 East.

See also
 List of botanical gardens in the United States

References

Arboreta in Utah
Botanical gardens in Utah
Protected areas of Utah County, Utah
2003 establishments in Utah